{{DISPLAYTITLE:C26H29NO2}}
The molecular formula C26H29NO2 (molar mass: 387.5139  g/mol) may refer to:

 Afimoxifene
 Droloxifene, also known as 3-hydroxytamoxifen

Molecular formulas